Asutifi South is one of the constituencies represented in the Parliament of Ghana. It elects one Member of Parliament (MP) by the first past the post system of election. Asutifi South is located in the Asutifi district of the Ahafo Region of Ghana.

Boundaries
The seat is located entirely within the Asutifi district of the Brong Ahafo Region of Ghana.

Members of Parliament

Elections

 
 
 
 
 
 
 

Due to the death of Philip Kofi Adjapong Amoah, (NPP) candidate standing for parliament, the elections in this constituency were postponed to 3 January 2001. Cecilia Djan Amoah, the (NPP) replacement candidate and also the widow of the deceased, won the seat with a majority of 550.

See also
List of Ghana Parliament constituencies

References 

Parliamentary constituencies in Ahafo Region